Arta is a town in southeastern Djibouti. The center of the Arta Region, it is the country's sixth-largest city. , the population was 11,043. Arta is situated on the Mountains of Arta and is famous for its mild climate.

History

Arta was a small village when the French created their French Somaliland. During the Middle Ages, it was ruled by the Ifat and Adal Sultanates subsequently came under Ottoman and French protection in the 18th century. Arta later formed a part of the French Somaliland protectorate in the first half of the 20th century. In  the December 1942 British invasion of French Somaliland, about 700 British troops and Free French troops occupied the town. Under French colonial rule in 1946, a new housing estate and hill station was built. Arta's climate lent itself to becoming the prime sanctuary of the French civil servants in Djibouti. The region of Arta is inhabited of the popular ethnic group of Djibouti, the Issa, formulated the "Declaration of Arta", in which they professed cohesion under the protection of France. They argued against the influence of the large independent neighboring countries of Ethiopia and Somalia and against the connection to one of these countries.

From May 2, 2000, peace talks between various factions of the Somali Civil War were held in the city with some 810 delegates, resulting in the establishment of the Transitional National Government of Somalia.

Geography and climate
It lies at an elevation of 755 metres (2,477 feet) above sea level. It lies on highlands known as the Arta Mountains. The temperate central portion, where Arta lies, is situated on a rocky highland plateau, which over looks the coastal plains. The town is connected to other environs by National Highway 4. Public buses go from Djibouti City to Arta. It takes half an hour to get to Arta. A contracted bus ride from Djibouti city to Arta can charge between 350 Djiboutian franc.

Sunshine is abundant in the town, averaging eight to ten hours a day year-round. It is lowest during the wet season, when there is some coastal fog and greater cloud coverage as warm air passes over the mountains.

Arta has a hot arid climate (BWh) by the Köppen-Geiger system.

Demographics
, the population of Arta has been estimated to be 11,043. The town inhabitants belong to various mainly Afro-Asiatic-speaking ethnic groups, with the Issa Somali predominant.

Twin towns – sister cities

Arta is twinned with:

References

Arta Region
Populated places in Djibouti